Simona Koren (born 23 March 1993) is an Austrian footballer who plays as a forward for Norwegian club LSK Kvinner and the Austria national team.

Career
She started her football career in Union Luv Graz  in November 2004 when she was only 11 years old. She later went on to join FC Stattegg in June 2008 where she scored 32 goals in 32 games as 16 year old striker. 2009 season she followed up her impressive season before by scoring 20 goals in 40 games for FC Stattegg in the Austrian League. She became a highly rated talent in Austria. She was known for her speed, dribbling abilities and her finishing skills. In 2011 her abilities got noticed by DFC LUV Graz, where she went on and kept her scoring record.

In 2013 she moved to America to play college soccer for East Tennessee State Buccaneers. After an impressive spell with ETSU, she got picked by MSV Duisburg in 2017 for a short-term contract.

FA WSL team Sunderland signed a one-year contract with the Austrian international for the 2017–18 FA WSL season. Koren got a flying start for her new club and scored on her debut against Reading where they won the game 0–1. Unfortunately Sunderland Ladies had financial problems and they got relegated from the Women's Super League regardless how they performed in the league.

Koren moved to Växjö DFF in the Damallsvenskan. Struggling with injuries, she didn't manage to play a full season for Växjö. She suffered from shinsplints.

In 2020 she signed contract with LSK Kvinner in Norway.

References

External links

 
 
 Profile at East Tennessee State University
 Profile at Austrian Football Association (ÖFB) 

1993 births
Living people
Austrian women's footballers
Expatriate women's soccer players in the United States
Austrian expatriate women's footballers
Austrian expatriate sportspeople in the United States
Austria women's international footballers
East Tennessee State Buccaneers women's soccer players
Women's association football forwards
Expatriate women's footballers in England
Sunderland A.F.C. Ladies players
Women's Super League players
Austrian expatriate sportspeople in England
Medkila IL (women) players
Expatriate women's footballers in Norway
Toppserien players
Austrian expatriate sportspeople in Norway
Frauen-Bundesliga players
Expatriate women's footballers in Germany
MSV Duisburg (women) players
Växjö DFF players
Expatriate women's footballers in Sweden
Damallsvenskan players
Austrian expatriate sportspeople in Germany
ÖFB-Frauenliga players
DFC LUV Graz players